Johann Kolross (also Johannes Kolrose, Latinized Rhodonthracius, c. 1487 – c. 1560) was a poet, philologist and educator of the German Renaissance and the Protestant Reformation. He studied in Freiburg, and worked as rector of the boys' school in Basel from 1529. He published the Enchiridion, a textbook on orthography, in 1530.

He was known for his popular theatre plays, his Spil von Fünfferley betrachtnussen was performed in Basel in 1530.

He also wrote a number of hymns for the Protestant church service, including an adaptation of Psalm 127 (Wo Gott zum Haus nicht gibt sein Gunst ).

References
Karl Dienst: "Kolross, Johannes" in: Biographisch-Bibliographisches Kirchenlexikon vol. 4 (1992),   361–362.
Adalbert Elschenbroich: "Kolroß, Johannes" in: Neue Deutsche Biographie vol. 12 (1980), 477f.
Heidy Greco-Kaufmann: "Johannes Kolross" in: Andreas Kotte (ed.), Theaterlexikon der Schweiz vol. 2 (2005), 1017.
Wilhelm Scherer: "Kolros, Johannes" in: Allgemeine Deutsche Biographie vol.  16 (1882), 496 f.

External links
 

German poets
1480s births
1560 deaths
Writers from Basel-Stadt
16th-century dramatists and playwrights
German Renaissance humanists
Swiss Renaissance humanists
16th-century German writers
16th-century German male writers